The knockout stage of the 2007 AFC Asian Cup started on 21 July and ended on 29 July 2007. The top two teams from each preliminary group advanced to this stage.

Qualified teams

Bracket

Quarter-finals

Japan vs Australia

Iraq vs Vietnam

Iran vs South Korea

Saudi Arabia vs Uzbekistan

Semi-finals

Iraq vs South Korea

Japan vs Saudi Arabia

Third place play-off

Final

References

External links
 AFC Asian Cup 2007
 Asian Cup 2007 at RSSSF

knockout
2007 in Japanese football
2007 in Australian soccer
2007 in Vietnamese football
2007 in South Korean football
2007 in Uzbekistani football
2007–08 in Iranian football
Knock
Knock